Tresus is a genus of saltwater clams, marine bivalve mollusks in the family Mactridae. Many of them are known under the common name the horse clam or as species of gaper clam. They are similar to geoducks.

Species
Species within the genus Tresus include:
 Tresus allomyax (Coan & Scott, 2000) – strange gaper
 Tresus capax (Gould, 1850) – fat gaper
 Tresus keenae (Kuroda & Habe, 1950) – mirugai clam
 Tresus nuttallii (Conrad, 1837) – Pacific gaper
 Tresus pajaroanus (Conrad, 1857) – lost gaper

Habitat 
These species' habitat is the lower intertidal zones on out to waters as deep as 50–60 feet (13–15 m). They prefer sand, mud, and gravel substrates, normally burying themselves 12–16 inches (30–41 cm), so they are much easier to dig than geoducks. Their preferred substrates are also preferred by butter and littleneck clams, so horse clams are often taken incidentally in commercial harvesting.

Tresus clams often have a relationship with small commensal pea crabs, often a mating pair, which enter through the large siphon and live within the mantle cavity of the horse clam. The crabs are easily seen and in no way affect the clam as food. The meat is good and makes excellent chowder. They tend to be ignored by sport diggers in Washington but not in Oregon.

Notes and references 

Mactridae

Bivalve genera
Marine molluscs of North America
Molluscs of the Pacific Ocean
Molluscs of the United States
Western North American coastal fauna